Shwe (Ꚗ ꚗ; italics: Ꚗ ꚗ) is a letter of the Cyrillic script. It resembles the letter Sha (Ш ш Ш ш) with a long tail attached to its bottom. 

Shwe is used in an old orthography of the Abkhaz language, where it represents the labialized voiceless palato-alveolar sibilant . It corresponds to Шә.

Computing codes

See also 
Ш ш : Cyrillic letter Sha
Cyrillic characters in Unicode

Cyrillic letters